Bernard Reginster is an American philosopher. He is the Romeo Elton Professor of Natural Theology at Brown University. Reginster is known for his expertise on philosophy of Friedrich Nietzsche, particularly Nietzschean affirmation.
He is a recipient of Laurence S. Rockefeller Fellowship.

Books
The Affirmation of Life: Nietzsche on Overcoming Nihilism, Harvard University Press, 2006

References

External links
 Bernard Reginster at Brown University

21st-century American philosophers
Phenomenologists
Continental philosophers
Living people
University of Pennsylvania alumni
Loyola Marymount University faculty
Brown University faculty
Date of birth missing (living people)
Year of birth missing (living people)